Mundipharma International Limited is a British multinational research-based pharmaceutical company owned by members of the Sackler family with locations in United Kingdom, Canada, Germany, and Singapore. In Germany, Mundipharma is a subsidiary of Mundipharma International Limited and Mundipharma AG. Its global headquarters located at the Cambridge Science Park of Cambridge, England.

History 
The company was founded in 1952 in Frankfurt, Germany by the brothers Raymond and Mortimer Sackler, the owners of Purdue Pharma at the time. Between 1970 and 1974 two pharmaceutical companies were acquired. It was the chemical-pharmaceutical factory Krugmann GmbH and the pharmaceutical factory Dr. med. Hans Voigt GmbH. In 1975 the company moved to Limburg an der Lahn in Germany.

The first factory building was designed in 1973 by architect Marcel Breuer and built in the Dietkircher Höhe industrial park. The last completion of a structural expansion took place in 2010.

The company is exploring a sale as part of the Purdue Pharma bankruptcy process and Sackler family settlement. It could fetch as much as $5 billion according to Bloomberg News.

Organization structure 
The research area is outsourced to the following companies:

 Mundipharma Research GmbH & Co. KG, Limburg an der Lahn (closed in 2018)
 Mundipharma Research Ltd, Cambridge

References 

British companies established in 1952
Companies based in Cambridge
Dental companies
Health care companies of the United Kingdom
Multinational companies headquartered in England
Pharmaceutical companies of England
Pharmaceutical companies established in 1952
Privately held companies of England